Satanmuanglek is a retired Thai Muay Thai fighter and a former boxer.

In professional boxing, after an unsuccessful world championship challenge, in late 2019 he announced his retirement from professional boxing. He will fight Muay Thai only.

Titles and accomplishments

Muay Thai
Lumpinee Stadium
 2013 Lumpinee Stadium 105 lbs Champion
 2015 Lumpinee Stadium 108 lbs Champion
Professional Boxing Association of Thailand (PAT) 
 2013 Thailand 105 lbs Champion (1 defense)
 2013 Thailand 108 lbs Champion
World Muay Thai Organization
 2020 WMO 112 lbs Champion
World Muaythai Council
 2012 WMC World 100 lbs Champion
 Petchyindee True4U Muaymanwansuk
 2016 True4U 108 lbs Champion (2 defenses)

Boxing
 2019 OPBF Silver Light Flyweight Champion
 2018 WBC Asian Boxing Council Minimumweight Champion (3 defenses)

Professional Boxing record

|-
|12
|Loss
|11–1
|style="text-align:left;"| Hiroto Kyoguchi
|UD
|12 (12) ||
|19 June 2019
|style="text-align:left;"| 
|style="text-align:left;"|
|-
|11
|Win
|11–0
|style="text-align:left;"| Crison Omayao
|
|4 (10)||
|22 Feb 2019
|style="text-align:left;"| 
|style="text-align:left;"|
|-
|10
|Win
|10–0
|style="text-align:left;"| Marco John Rementizo
|
|10 (10)||
|26 Oct 2018
|style="text-align:left;"| 
|style="text-align:left;"|
|-
|9
|Win
|9–0
|style="text-align:left;"| Mektison Marganti
|
|6 (6)||
|9 Sept 2018
|style="text-align:left;"| 
|
|-
|8
|Win
|8–0
|style="text-align:left;"| Thomas Tope Hurek	
|
|6 (12)||
|31 July 2018
|style="text-align:left;"| 
|style="text-align:left;"|
|-
|7
|Win
|7–0
|style="text-align:left;"| Silem Serang	
|
|5 (12)||
|25 May 2018
|style="text-align:left;"| 
|style="text-align:left;"|
|-
|6
|Win
|6–0
|style="text-align:left;"| Geboi Mansalayao
|
|5 (12)||
|23 Mar 2018
|style="text-align:left;"| 
|style="text-align:left;"|
|-
|5
|Win
|5–0
|style="text-align:left;"| Domi Nenokeba
|
|6 (6)||
|23 Feb 2018
|style="text-align:left;"| 
|
|-
|4
|Win
|4–0
|style="text-align:left;"| Melianus Mirin	
|
|10 (10)||
|26 Jan 2018
|style="text-align:left;"| 
|style="text-align:left;"|
|-
|3
|Win
|3–0
|style="text-align:left;"| Minh Phat Sam
|
|6 (6)||
|15 Dec 2017
|style="text-align:left;"| 
|
|-
|2
|Win
|2–0
|style="text-align:left;"| Mektison Marganti
|
|6 (6)||
|24 Nov 2017
|style="text-align:left;"| 
|
|-
|1
|Win
|1–0
|style="text-align:left;"| Silem Serang
|
|6 (6)||
|29 Sept 2017
|style="text-align:left;"| 
|
|-
| colspan=10 |  Legend:

Muay Thai record

|-  style="background:#fbb;"
| 2021-09-30|| Loss ||align=left| Petchsila Wor.Auracha || Petchyindee|| Buriram, Thailand || Decision || 5 ||3:00 
|-  style="background:#fbb;"
| 2021-03-25|| Loss ||align=left| Phetsomjit Jitmuangnon || Petchyindee, Rangsit Stadium || Rangsit, Thailand || Decision || 5 ||3:00
|-  style="background:#cfc;"
| 2020-09-11|| Win ||align=left| Rungnarai Kiatmuu9 || Petchyindee + True4U , Rangsit Stadium ||Rangsit, Thailand || Decision || 5 || 3:00
|-
! style=background:white colspan=9 |
|-  style="background:#cfc;"
| 2020-08-07|| Win||align=left| Petchthailand Mor.RajabhatSurin || True4U Muaymanwansuk, Rangsit Stadium ||Rangsit, Thailand || KO (Elbow) || 3 ||
|-  style="background:#fbb;"
| 2020-01-31|| Loss ||align=left| Phetsomjit Jitmuangnon || Phuket Super Fight Real Muay Thai || Mueang Phuket District, Thailand || Decision || 5 ||3:00
|-  style="background:#cfc;"
| 2019-12-26|| Win||align=left| Phetsommai Sor.Sommai || Rajadamnern Stadium ||Bangkok, Thailand || KO (Elbow) || 3 ||
|-  style="background:#cfc;"
| 2019-12-05|| Win ||align=left| Anuwat Natkinpla || Rajadamnern Stadium || Bangkok, Thailand || KO (Left Elbow)|| 4 ||
|-  style="background:#FFBBBB;"
| 2019-11-06|| Loss ||align=left| Chanalert Meenayothin || Rajadamnern Stadium || Bangkok, Thailand || Decision || 5 || 3:00
|-  style="background:#cfc;"
| 2019-10-03|| Win ||align=left| Chanalert Meenayothin || Rajadamnern Stadium || Bangkok, Thailand || Decision || 5 || 3:00
|-  style="background:#FFBBBB;"
| 2019-09-10|| Loss||align=left| Phetsomjit Jitmuangnon || Lumpinee Stadium || Bangkok, Thailand || Decision || 5 || 3:00
|-  style="background:#FFBBBB;"
| 2019-08-09|| Loss||align=left| Phetsomjit Jitmuangnon || Lumpinee Stadium || Bangkok, Thailand || Decision || 5 || 3:00
|-  style="background:#cfc;"
| 2019-03-21|| Win ||align=left| Phetsomjit Jitmuangnon || Rajadamnern Stadium || Bangkok, Thailand || Decision || 5 || 3:00
|-  style="background:#cfc;"
| 2018-12-26|| Win ||align=left| Anuwat Natkinpla || Rajadamnern Stadium || Bangkok, Thailand || Decision || 5 || 3:00
|-  style="background:#FFBBBB;"
| 2017-08-04|| Loss ||align=left| Sam-D Petchyindee Academy || True4U Paedprakan tournament final, Rangsit Stadium || Rangsit, Thailand || KO (Low kicks & body kick) || 4 || 2:45
|-
! style=background:white colspan=9 |
|-  style="background:#cfc;"
| 2017-06-30|| Win ||align=left| Diesellek Wor.Wanchai || True4U Muaymanwansuk, Rangsit Stadium || Rangsit, Thailand || Decision || 5 || 3:00
|-  style="background:#cfc;"
| 2017-05-12|| Win ||align=left| Wanchai Kiatmuu9 || True4U Muaymanwansuk, Rangsit Stadium || Rangsit, Thailand || KO || 4 ||
|-  style="background:#FFBBBB;"
| 2017-04-05|| Loss ||align=left| Sarawut Sor.Jor.Vichitpedriew || Rajadamnern Stadium || Bangkok, Thailand || Decision || 5 || 3:00
|-  style="background:#cfc;"
| 2017-03-03|| Win ||align=left| Priewpark Sor.Jor.Vichitpedriew || True4U Muaymanwansuk, Rangsit Stadium || Rangsit, Thailand || KO (Left elbow) || 4 || 2:00
|-  style="background:#cfc;"
| 2017-01-27|| Win ||align=left| Wanchai Kiatmuu9 || True4U Muaymanwansuk, Rangsit Stadium || Rangsit, Thailand || Decision || 5 || 3:00 
|-
! style=background:white colspan=9 |
|-  style="background:#cfc;"
| 2017-01-05|| Win ||align=left| Tongnoi Lukbanyai || Rajadamnern Stadium || Bangkok, Thailand || TKO || 3 ||
|-  style="background:#cfc;"
| 2016-12-12|| Win ||align=left| Ongree Sor.Dechapan || Rajadamnern Stadium || Bangkok, Thailand || Decision || 5 || 3:00
|-  style="background:#cfc;"
| 2016-10-07|| Win ||align=left| Tukatatong Sor.Kiatwat || Rangsit Boxing Stadium || Rangsit, Thailand || KO  || 4 || 
|-
! style=background:white colspan=9 |
|-  style="background:#cfc;"
| 2016-09-02|| Win ||align=left| Jaroenpon Poptheeratham || Rangsit Boxing Stadium || Rangsit, Thailand || KO  || 3 || 
|-
! style=background:white colspan=9 |
|-  style="background:#cfc;"
| 2016-08-11|| Win ||align=left| Luktoy F.A.Group || Rajadamnern Stadium || Bangkok, Thailand || KO (Left elbow) || 5 ||
|-  style="background:#FFBBBB;"
| 2016-07-14|| Loss ||align=left| Jaroenpon Poptheeratham || Rajadamnern Stadium || Bangkok, Thailand || Decision || 5 || 3:00
|-  style="background:#cfc;"
| 2016-06-10|| Win ||align=left| Jaroenpon Poptheeratham || Lumpinee Stadium || Bangkok, Thailand || Decision || 5 || 3:00 
|-
! style=background:white colspan=9 |
|-  style="background:#FFBBBB;"
| 2016-05-09|| Loss ||align=left| Rungnarai Kiatmuu9 || Rajadamnern Stadium || Bangkok, Thailand || KO (Right high kick) || 3 ||  
|-
! style=background:white colspan=9 |
|-  style="background:#cfc;"
| 2016-03-22|| Win ||align=left| Wanchai Kiatmuu9 || Lumpinee Stadium || Bangkok, Thailand || Decision || 5 || 3:00
|-  style="background:#cfc;"
| 2016-02-29|| Win ||align=left| Tuktaphet Teeded99 || Rajadamnern Stadium || Bangkok, Thailand || KO || 4 ||
|-  style="background:#cfc;"
| 2016-02-04|| Win ||align=left| Ruangdej Sakvichian || Rajadamnern Stadium || Bangkok, Thailand || Decision || 5 || 3:00
|-  style="background:#cfc;"
| 2015-12-25|| Win ||align=left| Sam-D Petchyindee Academy || Lumpinee Stadium || Bangkok, Thailand || Decision || 5 || 3:00
|-
! style=background:white colspan=9 |
|-  style="background:#FFBBBB;"
| 2015-11-02|| Loss ||align=left| Wanchai Kiatmuu9 || Rajadamnern Stadium || Bangkok, Thailand || Decision || 5 || 3:00
|-  style="background:#cfc;"
| 2015-09-27|| Win ||align=left| Thanadet Thor.Pran49 || Imperial Lat Phrao Boxing Stadium || Lat Phrao, Thailand || Decision || 5 || 3:00
|-  style="background:#FFBBBB;"
| 2015-08-11|| Loss ||align=left| Rungnarai Kiatmuu9 || Rajadamnern Stadium || Bangkok, Thailand || Decision || 5 || 3:00
|-  style="background:#FFBBBB;"
| 2015-07-14|| Loss ||align=left| Achanai PetchyindeeAcademy || Rajadamnern Stadium || Bangkok, Thailand || Decision || 5 || 3:00
|-  style="background:#cfc;"
| 2015-06-11|| Win ||align=left| Wanchai Kiatmuu9 || Rajadamnern Stadium || Bangkok, Thailand || Decision || 5 || 3:00
|-  style="background:#cfc;"
| 2015-05-05|| Win ||align=left| Banlangnoen Suwasangmancha || Lumpinee Stadium || Bangkok, Thailand || Decision || 5 || 3:00
|-  style="background:#FFBBBB;"
| 2015-04-02|| Loss ||align=left| Rungnarai Kiatmuu9 || Rajadamnern Stadium || Bangkok, Thailand || Decision || 5 || 3:00
|-  style="background:#FFBBBB;"
| 2015-03-06|| Loss ||align=left| Wanchai Kiatmuu9 || Lumpinee Stadium || Bangkok, Thailand || Decision || 5 || 3:00
|-
! style=background:white colspan=9 |
|-  style="background:#FFBBBB;"
| 2015-01-26|| Loss ||align=left| Rungnarai Kiatmuu9 || Rajadamnern Stadium || Bangkok, Thailand || Decision || 5 || 3:00
|-  style="background:#cfc;"
| 2014-11-25|| Win ||align=left| Thanadet Thor.Pran49 || Lumpinee Stadium || Bangkok, Thailand || Decision || 5 || 3:00
|-  style="background:#FFBBBB;"
| 2014-10-28|| Loss ||align=left| Thanadet Thor.Pran49 || Lumpinee Stadium || Bangkok, Thailand || Decision || 5 || 3:00
|-  style="background:#cfc;"
| 2014-09-29|| Win ||align=left| Khunhan Sitthongsak || Rajadamnern Stadium || Bangkok, Thailand || Decision || 5 || 3:00
|-  style="background:#cfc;"
| 2014-08-28|| Win ||align=left| Palangpon PetchyindeeAcademy || Rajadamnern Stadium || Bangkok, Thailand || Decision || 5 || 3:00
|-  style="background:#cfc;"
| 2014-07-31|| Win ||align=left| Detkart Por. Pongsawan || Rajadamnern Stadium || Bangkok, Thailand || KO (Left high kick) || 2 ||
|-  style="background:#cfc;"
| 2014-07-06|| Win||align=left| Wanchai Kiatmuu9 || Aswindam, Ladprao Stadium || Thailand || Decision || 5 || 3:00

|-  style="background:#cfc;"
| 2014-05-08|| Win ||align=left| Detkart Por. Pongsawan || Rajadamnern Stadium || Bangkok, Thailand || Decision || 5 || 3:00
|-  style="background:#FFBBBB;"
| 2014-04-04|| Loss ||align=left| Wanchai RamboIsan ||  || Songkhla Province, Thailand || Decision || 5 || 3:00
|-  style="background:#cfc;"
| 2014-03-07|| Win ||align=left| Detkart Por. Pongsawan || Lumpinee Stadium || Bangkok, Thailand || KO (Punches & knee to the body) || 4 ||
|-  style="background:#FFBBBB;"
| 2014-02-07|| Loss ||align=left| Ruangsak Sitniwat || Lumpinee Stadium || Bangkok, Thailand || Decision || 5 || 3:00
|-  style="background:#cfc;"
| 2014-01-03|| Win ||align=left| Palangpon PetchyindeeAcademy || Lumpinee Stadium || Bangkok, Thailand || Decision || 5 || 3:00
|-  style="background:#cfc;"
| 2013-12-03|| Win ||align=left|  Sam-D Petchyindee Academy || Lumpinee Stadium || Bangkok, Thailand || Decision || 5 || 3:00
|-
! style=background:white colspan=9 |
|-  style="background:#FFBBBB;"
| 2013-10-10|| Loss ||align=left|  Wanchai RamboIsan || Rajadamnern Stadium || Bangkok, Thailand || Decision || 5 || 3:00
|-  style="background:#cfc;"
| 2013-09-13|| Win ||align=left| Sam-D Petchyindee Academy || Lumpinee Stadium || Bangkok, Thailand || Decision || 5 || 3:00
|-  style="background:#FFBBBB;"
| 2013-08-12|| Loss ||align=left|  Detkart Por Pongsawang || Rajadamnern Stadium || Bangkok, Thailand || Decision || 5 || 3:00
|-  style="background:#FFBBBB;"
| 2013-07-11|| Loss ||align=left|  Ploysiam Petchyindeeacademy || Rajadamnern Stadium || Bangkok, Thailand || Decision || 5 || 3:00
|-  style="background:#cfc;"
| 2013-06-07|| Win ||align=left| Newlukrak Pakornsurin || Lumpinee Stadium || Bangkok, Thailand || Decision || 5 || 3:00
|-
! style=background:white colspan=9 |
|-  style="background:#cfc;"
| 2013-05-09|| Win ||align=left| Wanchai RamboIsan || Rajadamnern Stadium || Bangkok, Thailand || Decision || 5 || 3:00
|-  style="background:#cfc;"
| 2013-04-09|| Win ||align=left| Dokmaidang JSP || Lumpinee Stadium || Bangkok, Thailand || KO (Left elbow) || 2 || 
|-
! style=background:white colspan=9 |
|-  style="background:#cfc;"
| 2013-03-13|| Win ||align=left| Ploysiam Petchyindeeacademy || Lumpinee Stadium || Bangkok, Thailand || Decision || 5 || 3:00
|-  style="background:#cfc;"
| 2013-02-08|| Win ||align=left| Niwlukrak Eksindeekongym || Lumpinee Stadium || Bangkok, Thailand || KO (Left low kick) || 3 || 
|-
! style=background:white colspan=9 |
|-  style="background:#cfc;"
| 2013-01-11|| Win ||align=left| Dokmaidang JSP || Lumpinee Stadium || Bangkok, Thailand || Decision || 5 || 3:00
|-  style="background:#cfc;"
| 2012-12-18|| Win ||align=left| Phetmuangchon Por.Suantong || Lumpinee Stadium || Bangkok, Thailand || KO (Left elbow) ||  ||
|-  style="background:#FFBBBB;"
| 2012-11-13|| Loss ||align=left| Peteng Kiatphontip || Lumpinee Stadium || Bangkok, Thailand || Decision || 5 || 3:00
|-
! style=background:white colspan=9 |
|-  style="background:#c5d2ea;"
| 2012-08-31 || Draw||align=left|  Yodmanut Phetpotong || Lumpinee Stadium || Bangkok, Thailand || Decision || 5 || 3:00
|-  style="background:#FFBBBB;"
| 2012-07-12|| Loss ||align=left| Phetmuangchon Por.Suantong || Rajadamnern Stadium || Bangkok, Thailand || Decision || 5 || 3:00
|-  style="background:#cfc;"
| 2012-05-25 || Win ||align=left| Chopper Kor.Sapaothong || Lumpinee Stadium || Bangkok, Thailand || Decision || 5 || 3:00
|-  style="background:#cfc;"
| 2012-03-21 || Win ||align=left| Kumantong Jitmuangnon || Rajadamnern Stadium || Bangkok, Thailand || Decision || 5 || 3:00
|-
! style=background:white colspan=9 |

|-  style="background:#fbb;"
| 2012-01-06 || Loss||align=left| Dejsak Sakwichian || Lumpinee Stadium || Bangkok, Thailand || Decision || 5 || 3:00

|-  style="background:#cfc;"
| 2011-11-29 || Win||align=left| Denthoranee Sor.Weerapol || Lumpinee Stadium || Bangkok, Thailand || Decision || 5 || 3:00

|-  style="background:#fbb;"
| 2011-09-28 || Loss||align=left| Paeteng Kiatphontip || Rajadamnern Stadium || Bangkok, Thailand || Decision || 5 || 3:00

|-  style="background:#cfc;"
| 2011-07-31|| Win ||align=left| Yu Wor.Wanchai || Muay Thai WINDY Super Fight vol.8|| Tokyo, Japan || Decision (Unanimous)|| 5 || 3:00
|-
| colspan=9 | Legend:

References

Satanmuanglek CP Freshmart
Living people
1992 births
Satanmuanglek CP Freshmart
Satanmuanglek CP Freshmart
Mini-flyweight boxers
Light-flyweight boxers
Flyweight boxers